Fernando José Jácome Clavijo (born January 25, 1980) is a freestyle swimmer from Colombia. He competed at the 2000 Summer Olympics in Sydney, Australia for his native country. There he ended up in 47th place in the Men's 100m Freestyle, clocking 52.24 in the preliminary heats, and in 34th place (1:54.17) in the Men's 200m Freestyle.

References
sports-reference

1980 births
Living people
Colombian male freestyle swimmers
Olympic swimmers of Colombia
Swimmers at the 1999 Pan American Games
Swimmers at the 2000 Summer Olympics
Place of birth missing (living people)
Pan American Games competitors for Colombia
Central American and Caribbean Games gold medalists for Colombia
Competitors at the 1998 Central American and Caribbean Games
Central American and Caribbean Games medalists in swimming
20th-century Colombian people
21st-century Colombian people